is a Japanese professional basketball player who plays for the Shinshu Brave Warriors of the B.League in Japan. He played college basketball for the University of Tsukuba.

Career statistics

|-
| align="left" |2016-17
| align="left"  rowspan="2" |Tochigi
|11  ||0||7.1||.393  ||.375  ||.600  ||1.00  ||0.2  ||0.0  ||0.1  ||0.5  ||3.0
|-
| align="left" |  2017-18
|57  ||0||17.6||.389  ||.330  ||.818  ||1.3  ||1.1  ||0.3  ||0.1  ||0.6  ||5.1 
|-
| align="left" |  2018-19
| align="left"  rowspan="1" |Mikawa
|53  ||46||20.3||.346  ||.275  ||.750  ||2.2  ||2.1  ||0.5  ||0.1  ||0.8  ||3.8 
|-
| align="left" |  2019-20
| align="left"  rowspan="1" | Yokohama
|  ||　||||  ||  ||  ||  ||  ||  ||  ||  || 
|-
|}

References

External links 
 

1994 births
Living people
Japanese men's basketball players
Utsunomiya Brex players
Sportspeople from Tokushima Prefecture
People from Tokushima (city)
Yokohama B-Corsairs players
Point guards